Kissing Candice is a 2017 Irish drama film directed by Aoife McArdle and starring Ann Skelly. It was screened in the Discovery section at the 2017 Toronto International Film Festival and had its European premiere at the Berlin International Film Festival in February 2018.

Cast
 Ann Skelly as Candice
 Ryan Lincoln as Jacob
 Conall Keating as Dermot
 Ryan McParland as Conor
 Caitriona Ennis as Martha
 John Lynch as Donal
 Jack Nolan as Wolfman
 Tony Doyle as Sharkey
 Maghnús Foy as Monk
 James Greene as Maguire
 Seaghán Óg O'Neill as Aaron
 Jason Cullen as Caleb
 Kwaku Fortune as Finn

Reception
The film holds an approval rating of 71% on Rotten Tomatoes, based on 14 reviews, with an average rating of 6.3/10.

Peter Bradshaw of The Guardian said, "Aoife McArdle's tale of a teenager rescued in reality by a stranger from her fantasies is an audacious delight." Hot Press wrote, "At once raw and stylised, dreamlike and terrifyingly real, Kissing Candice is a bleak portrait of Ireland, but a compelling one." Sinead McCausland of Film School Rejects wrote, "For a film so assured, stylised and well paced, McArdle has certainly made an impressive, and memorable, debut."

Controversy 
Even though it screened as part of the Generation 14plus section at the 2018 Berlinale, the film was given an 18 certificate by the Irish Film Classification Office. The film was given a 15 rating in the United Kingdom.

References

External links
 
 
 

2017 films
2017 drama films
Irish drama films
English-language Irish films
2010s English-language films